Patrick Mullen is the name of:

Patrick Mullen (ice hockey) (born 1986), American ice hockey player
Patrick Mullen (Medal of Honor) (1844–1897), member of the United States Navy

See also
Pat Mullin (1917–1999), baseball player
Patrick Mullins (born 1992), soccer player